The Bernice Coalfield is in Cherry and Colley Townships of Sullivan County, Pennsylvania. The villages of Mildred, Lopez, Murraytown and Bernice surround the Coalfields. Primarily semi-anthracite coal was mined here. Both strip mining and deep mining was done.

References

Anthracite Coal Region of Pennsylvania
Coal mining regions in the United States
Geography of Sullivan County, Pennsylvania
Mining in Pennsylvania